6β-Hydroxycortisol is an endogenous steroid. In humans, it is a metabolite of cortisol produced by cytochrome p450-3A monooxygenases, mainly, CYP3A4. 6β-hydroxycortisol is used as a biomarker of CYP3A4 activity. Drugs that induce CYP3A4 may accelerate cortisol clearance, by accelerating cortisol conversion to 6β-hydroxycortisol.

See also
 CYP3A4
 Cortisol
 18-Hydroxycortisol

References

Steroids